David Gaudu (born 10 October 1996) is a French professional cyclist who rides for UCI WorldTeam .

Career
In 2016, Gaudu won the Tour de l'Avenir, the most prestigious U23 cycling race. In addition to this he won the Peace Race U23 and finished 5th in the Tour de l'Ain, a UCI 2.1 cycling race. These successes earned him an initial two-year contract with UCI WorldTeam .

In July 2018, he was named in the start list for the 2018 Tour de France. In October 2020, he was named in the startlist for the 2020 Vuelta a España. The 2020 Vuelta was his strongest performance in a Grand Tour thus far in his career as he won stage 11, as well as stage 17, and finished the race in 8th place overall.

On stage 3 of the 2022 Critérium du Dauphiné Gaudu was five or six riders deep as the sprint for the finish line began. Wout Van Aert overpowered all the other riders and as the finish approached began to celebrate when he noticed Gaudu flying past him out of the corner of his eye and immediately lowered his hands knowing he had been bested. Gaudu slowed to a stop a few hundred meters past the finish line and celebrated with his teammates.

He said that he just could not see himself riding for any other colours. During the Tour he had the requisite first week luck and throughout the second week stayed with the majority of the elite GC contenders. He was also in a battle with respected veteran Romain Bardet for the highest placed French rider, although he did essentially say that being the best French rider shouldn't be the goal if French riding wants to regain the top step of the Tour podium. Gaudu survived the final climbs of Peyragudes and Hautacam as the heavy climbing ended in the Pyrenees. He was in position to finish top 5 overall going into the final ITT. He rode strong enough during the time trial to enter Paris in 4th place overall.

Major results

2014
 1st  Overall Aubel–Thimister–La Gleize
1st Stage 3
 6th Overall Ronde des Vallées
2016
 1st  Overall Tour de l'Avenir
1st Stage 6
 1st  Overall Course de la Paix U23
1st  Points classification
1st Stage 2
 5th Overall Tour de l'Ain
 9th Grand Prix de Plumelec-Morbihan
2017
 2nd Overall Tour de l'Ain
1st  Young rider classification
1st Stage 3
 2nd Boucles de l'Aulne
 4th Route Adélie
 5th Milano–Torino
 7th Tour du Finistère
 9th La Flèche Wallonne
2018
 2nd Memorial Marco Pantani
 5th Classic Sud-Ardèche
 9th Overall Tour La Provence
2019
 3rd Overall UAE Tour
1st  Young rider classification
 4th Gran Premio Bruno Beghelli
 5th Overall Tour de Romandie
1st  Young rider classification
1st Stage 3
 5th Milano–Torino
 6th Overall Tour La Provence
1st  Young rider classification
 6th Liège–Bastogne–Liège
2020
 4th Overall UAE Tour
 8th Overall Vuelta a España
1st Stages 11 & 17
 10th Overall Tour de la Provence
2021
 1st Classic Sud-Ardèche
 3rd Liège–Bastogne–Liège
 5th Overall Tour of the Basque Country
1st Stage 6
 5th Tour du Jura
 6th Overall Tour des Alpes-Maritimes et du Var
1st  Young rider classification
 6th Overall Tour de Luxembourg
1st Stage 5
 6th Milano–Torino
 7th Road race, Olympic Games
 7th Giro di Lombardia
 7th La Flèche Wallonne
 8th Tre Valli Varesine
 9th Overall Critérium du Dauphiné
1st  Young rider classification
  Combativity award Stage 18 Tour de France
2022
 1st Stage 3 Critérium du Dauphiné
 3rd Mercan'Tour Classic
 4th Overall Tour de France
 5th Overall Volta ao Algarve
1st Stage 2
 5th Grand Prix Cycliste de Montréal
2023
 2nd Overall Paris-Nice
 2nd Faun-Ardèche Classic
 4th La Drôme Classic
 7th Overall Tour des Alpes-Maritimes et du Var
1st  Mountains classification

General classification results timeline

References

External links

1996 births
Living people
French male cyclists
French Vuelta a España stage winners
Sportspeople from Finistère
Olympic cyclists of France
Cyclists at the 2020 Summer Olympics
Cyclists from Brittany
21st-century French people